The 12th parallel north is a circle of latitude that is 12 degrees north of the Earth's equatorial plane. It crosses Africa, the Indian Ocean, South Asia, Southeast Asia, the Pacific Ocean, Central America, South America and the Atlantic Ocean.

At this latitude the sun is visible for 12 hours, 50 minutes during the summer solstice and 11 hours, 25 minutes during the winter solstice.

Around the world
Starting at the Prime Meridian and heading eastwards, the parallel 12° north passes through:

{| class="wikitable plainrowheaders"
! scope="col" | Co-ordinates
! scope="col" | Country, territory or sea
! scope="col" | Notes
|-
| 
! scope="row" | 
|
|-
| 
! scope="row" | 
| For about 15 km
|-
| 
! scope="row" | 
|
|-
| 
! scope="row" | 
|
|-
| 
! scope="row" | 
| Passing through Kano
|-
| 
! scope="row" | 
| 
|-
| 
! scope="row" | 
| Passing just south of N'Djamena
|-
| 
! scope="row" | 
|
|-
| 
! scope="row" | 
|
|-
| 
! scope="row" | 
|
|-
| 
! scope="row" | 
| Passing through Lake Tana
|-
| 
! scope="row" | 
|
|-valign="top"
| style="background:#b0e0e6;" | 
! scope="row" style="background:#b0e0e6;" | Indian Ocean
| style="background:#b0e0e6;" | Gulf of Aden – passing just north of the northernmost point of  Arabian Sea – passing just south of the Socotra archipelago, 
|-valign="top"
| 
! scope="row" | 
| Kerala Karnataka Tamil Nadu Puducherry – for about 4 km Tamil Nadu
|-
| style="background:#b0e0e6;" | 
! scope="row" style="background:#b0e0e6;" | Indian Ocean
| style="background:#b0e0e6;" | Bay of Bengal
|-
| 
! scope="row" | 
| Andaman and Nicobar Islands – South Andaman Island and Havelock Island
|-
| style="background:#b0e0e6;" | 
! scope="row" style="background:#b0e0e6;" | Indian Ocean
| style="background:#b0e0e6;" | Andaman Sea
|-
| 
! scope="row" |  (Burma)
| Mergui Archipelago and mainland
|-
| 
! scope="row" | 
| Prachuap Khiri Khan province
|-
| style="background:#b0e0e6;" | 
! scope="row" style="background:#b0e0e6;" | Gulf of Thailand
| style="background:#b0e0e6;" |
|-
| 
! scope="row" | 
| Island of Ko Chang
|-
| style="background:#b0e0e6;" | 
! scope="row" style="background:#b0e0e6;" | Gulf of Thailand
| style="background:#b0e0e6;" |
|-
| 
! scope="row" | 
| Trat province – for about 1 km
|-
| 
! scope="row" | 
|
|-
| 
! scope="row" | 
|
|-
| style="background:#b0e0e6;" | 
! scope="row" style="background:#b0e0e6;" | South China Sea
| style="background:#b0e0e6;" | Passing just north of the island of Culion, 
|-
| 
! scope="row" | 
| Busuanga Island
|-
| style="background:#b0e0e6;" | 
! scope="row" style="background:#b0e0e6;" | Sulu Sea
| style="background:#b0e0e6;" |
|-
| 
! scope="row" | 
| Semirara Island
|-valign="top"
| style="background:#b0e0e6;" | 
! scope="row" style="background:#b0e0e6;" | Sulu Sea
| style="background:#b0e0e6;" | Passing just north of the island of Molocamboc,  Passing just north of the island of Borocay, 
|-
| style="background:#b0e0e6;" | 
! scope="row" style="background:#b0e0e6;" | Sibuyan Sea
| style="background:#b0e0e6;" |
|-
| 
! scope="row" | 
| Masbate Island
|-
| style="background:#b0e0e6;" | 
! scope="row" style="background:#b0e0e6;" | Visayan Sea
| style="background:#b0e0e6;" | Asid Gulf
|-
| 
! scope="row" | 
| Masbate Island
|-valign="top"
| style="background:#b0e0e6;" | 
! scope="row" style="background:#b0e0e6;" | Samar Sea
| style="background:#b0e0e6;" | Passing just south of the island of Tagapul-an,  Passing just north of the island of Almagro,  Passing just north of the island of Camandag, 
|-
| 
! scope="row" | 
| Samar Island
|-valign="top"
| style="background:#b0e0e6;" | 
! scope="row" style="background:#b0e0e6;" | Pacific Ocean
| style="background:#b0e0e6;" | Passing just north of Enewetak atoll,  Passing just north of Bikini Atoll,  Passing just south of Bikar Atoll, 
|-
| 
! scope="row" | 
| Passing through Lake Nicaragua
|-valign="top"
| style="background:#b0e0e6;" | 
! scope="row" style="background:#b0e0e6;" | Caribbean Sea
| style="background:#b0e0e6;" | Passing just south of the Corn Islands,  Passing just south of the Albuquerque Cays, 
|-
| 
! scope="row" | 
| Guajira Peninsula
|-
| style="background:#b0e0e6;" | 
! scope="row" style="background:#b0e0e6;" | Caribbean Sea
| style="background:#b0e0e6;" | Gulf of Venezuela
|-
| 
! scope="row" | 
| Paraguaná Peninsula
|-valign="top"
| style="background:#b0e0e6;" | 
! scope="row" style="background:#b0e0e6;" | Caribbean Sea
| style="background:#b0e0e6;" | Passing between the islands of Curaçao and Klein Curaçao,  Passing just south of the island of Bonaire,  Passing just north of the Las Aves archipelago,  Passing just north of the Los Roques archipelago,  Passing just north of La Orchila island,  Passing just north of Blanquilla Island, 
|-
| 
! scope="row" | 
|
|-
| style="background:#b0e0e6;" | 
! scope="row" style="background:#b0e0e6;" | Atlantic Ocean
| style="background:#b0e0e6;" |
|-
| 
! scope="row" | 
|
|-
| 
! scope="row" | 
|
|-
| 
! scope="row" | 
| For about 3 km
|-
| 
! scope="row" | 
|
|-
| 
! scope="row" | 
|
|-
| 
! scope="row" | 
|
|-
| 
! scope="row" | 
|
|-
| 
! scope="row" | 
|
|-
| 
! scope="row" | 
| For about 1 km
|-
| 
! scope="row" | 
|
|}

See also
11th parallel north
13th parallel north

References

n12